William "Ty" Nestor is an American attorney and politician serving as a member of the West Virginia House of Delegates from the 43rd district. Elected in November 2020, he assumed office on December 1, 2020.

Background 
Nestor earned a Bachelor of Arts degree in political science and Juris Doctor from West Virginia University. Nestor is the founder of the Nestor Law Office and Tygart Valley Distributor, Inc. He was elected to the West Virginia House of Delegates in November 2020 and assumed office on December 1, 2020.

References 

Living people
West Virginia University alumni
West Virginia University College of Law alumni
West Virginia lawyers
Republican Party members of the West Virginia House of Delegates
21st-century American politicians
Year of birth missing (living people)